Bartch is a surname. Notable people with the surname include:

George W. Bartch (1849–1927), Justice of the Utah Supreme Court
Ben Bartch (born 1998), American football guard

See also
Barch
Baruch (given name)